is a Japanese women's professional shogi player ranked 5-dan.

Apprentice professional
In September 1998, Kai took a leave of absence from women's professional shogi to enter the Japan Shogi Association's apprentice school at the rank of 6-kyū. She remained in the apprentice school until August 2003 when she expressed her intention to return to women's professional play. She was awarded the rank of women's professional 1-dan upon reinstatement.

Women's shogi professional

Promotion history
Kai has been  promoted as follows.
 2-kyū: April 1, 1997
 1-kyū: April 1, 1998
 1-dan: September 1, 2003
 2-dan: September 18, 2006
 3-dan: April 19, 2010
 4-dan: June 29, 2011
 5-dan: November 23, 2014

Note: All ranks are women's professional ranks.

Titles and other championships
Kai has appeared in major title matches 12 times and has won a total of 7 titles. She has won the  title four times (201011, 201314), the  title twice (201314), and the  title once (2010). In addition to major titles, Kai has won two other shogi championships: the 11th  in 2006 and the 1st  in 2007.

Awards and honors
Kai has received the following Japan Shogi Association Annual Shogi Awards: "Women's Professional Award" in 2010 and 2013, and "Women's Professional of the Year" in 2014.

References

External links
ShogiHub: Professional Player Info · Kai, Tomomi

Japanese shogi players
Living people
Women's professional shogi players
People from Kawasaki, Kanagawa
Professional shogi players from Kanagawa Prefecture
1983 births
Women's Ōi
Kurashiki Tōka Cup
Queen (shogi)
People from Nanao, Ishikawa